Luigi Torchi invented the first direct multiplication machine in 1834. This was also the second key-driven machine in the world, following that of James White (1822).

Very little is known about the inventor and the machine. We only know that he was a carpenter; his machine was awarded of a gold metal from the Imperial-regio istituto lombardo di scienze, lettere e arti in Milan in 1834. A document of such occasion provides the known details of the machine, where a second document shows a drawing of the machine itself. However, no detailed documents about how it worked are known to exist.

The machine was exhibited in Brera between 1834 and 1837; it was later found by Giovanni Schiaparelli in bad conditions. After that, are not known further information about the machine.

Bibliography 
 Silvio Hénin, Two Early Italian Key-Driven Calculators, IEEE Annals of the History of Computing, vol. 32, no. 1, 2010, pp. 34–43.
 Silvio Hénin, Early Italian computing machines and their inventors. Reflections on the History of Computing. Springer, Berlin, Heidelberg, 2012. 204–230.

External links 
 History-Computer.com: Luigi Torchi

19th-century Italian inventors
Italian scientific instrument makers
1812 births
Year of death missing